Mario Ielpo (born 8 June 1963 in Rome) is an Italian former footballer who played as a goalkeeper.

Career
After beginning his career with Lazio, Ielpo had six successful years at Cagliari, before serving as A.C. Milan's reserve keeper during their successful period in the mid-1990s under manager Fabio Capello, behind starter Sebastiano Rossi. He usually only played for the club in Coppa Italia matches. He ended his career in 1998, after two years at Genoa.

After retirement
Ielpo now works as a television pundit, and he is also a qualified lawyer.

Honours
Milan
Serie A: 1993–94, 1995–96
Supercoppa Italiana: 1993, 1994
UEFA Champions League: 1993–94
UEFA Super Cup: 1994

External links
Profile at Lega-Calcio.it

References

1963 births
Living people
Italian footballers
Association football goalkeepers
S.S. Lazio players
A.C.N. Siena 1904 players
Cagliari Calcio players
A.C. Milan players
Genoa C.F.C. players
Serie A players
Serie B players
Serie C players
UEFA Champions League winning players